Aminata Touré (12 December 1952 – 12 January 2022) was a Guinean politician. She served as mayor of Kaloum from 2018 until her death in 2022.

Life and career
Aminata was the daughter of former President Ahmed Sékou Touré and his wife, Marguéritte Colle. She attended school in Conakry with her brother, Mohamed. After the 1984 Guinean coup d'état and her father's death, she sought refuge in Morocco and worked as an entrepreneur. In 2018, she relaunched herself into politics with the party Kaloum Yigui.

Early in her life, Touré was an activist within her father's party, the Democratic Party of Guinea. However, she moved away from political life while in exile in Morocco. Upon her return, she founded the party Kaloum Yigui. She was elected mayor of Kaloum on 4 February 2018, receiving a unanimous vote from each of the commune's 29 councilors. The governor of the Conakry Region, Mathurin Bangoura, launched a massive sanitation campaign. Touré's administration benefited from the campaign and aided a successful garbage collection drive. Her victory was seen as a blow to Guinea's ruling party, the Rally of the Guinean People, in the strategic commune in the Conakry Region.

Touré was a strong advocate for the ideals of her father, saying that "President Ahmed Sékou Touré was the father of all Guinean youth. It is true that we are his children but he considered all Guinean youth as his children. So the priority was not us, but the priority was all the young people of Guinea. He was an affable father, an understanding father who listened to his children and who, as usual, listened to everyone". She was outspoken about the misdeeds of France throughout the colonial regime of French Guinea and the French Republic's actions during the African nation's drive for independence.

She died in Morocco following a long illness, on 12 January 2022, at the age of 69.

References

1952 births
2022 deaths
21st-century Guinean women politicians
21st-century Guinean politicians
Guinean women
Mayors of places in Guinea
Democratic Party of Guinea – African Democratic Rally politicians
Daughters of national leaders
People from Conakry